My Friend Fela,, is a 2019 Brazilian biographical documentary film directed by Joel Zito Araújo and produced by Luiza Botelho Almeida. The film was influenced by Fela Kuti, an Afrobeat pioneer and activist from Nigeria. 

The film received positive reviews and won several awards at international film festivals.

Cast
 Fela Kuti as himself
 Carlos Moore as himself

Accolades 
 Africa Movie Academy Awards for Best Diaspora Documentary.

References

External links
 
 My Friend Fela on YouTube
 My Friend Fela and Birth of Afrobeat on World Channel
 My Friend Fela and Birth of Afrobeat on KCET
 My Friend Fela and Birth of Afrobeat on Thirteen
 BOZAR CENTRE FOR FINE ARTS

2019 films
2019 documentary films
Brazilian documentary films
2010s Portuguese-language films